Laurence Kelly (born 1 December 1946) is a former Irish Fianna Fáil politician who served as a Teachta Dála (TD) for the Cork North-West constituency from 1989 to 1992. 

He lost his seat at the 1992 general election.

References

1946 births
Living people
Fianna Fáil TDs
Members of the 26th Dáil
Local councillors in County Cork